Griffin Connor Isip McDaniel (born March 30, 2000) is a Filipino-American professional footballer who plays as a midfielder for Stallion Laguna of the Philippines Football League and the Philippines national under-23 team.

Personal life
McDaniel was born in Orange County, California and raised in Corona, California. He has attended the Norco High School. His mother Lindy is a Filipino who has roots in Pampanga and Davao City, while his father Clint is a football (soccer coach).

McDaniel's sisters, Olivia and Chandler, are Philippines women's international footballers.

Career

College career
McDaniel played college soccer for California Baptist University. He played 13 games in his freshman year and 15 games in his sophomore year.

Stallion Laguna
In August 2020, McDaniel joined Philippines Football League club Stallion Laguna. He made his debut in a 2–1 defeat against league debutants Maharlika Manila.

International career
McDaniel was born to an American father and Filipino mother making him eligible to play for United States and Philippines at international level.

Philippines U23
McDaniel was called up to represent the Philippines U23 in the 2019 Southeast Asian Games held in the Philippines. He made his debut for the U23 team in a 2–1 defeat against Myanmar U23, coming in as a substitute replacing Chima Uzoka in the 75th minute.

In February 2022, McDaniel was once again, called up to the Philippines U23 for the 2022 AFF U-23 Youth Championship held in Cambodia.

References

2000 births
Living people
Citizens of the Philippines through descent
American sportspeople of Filipino descent
Sportspeople from Orange County, California
Soccer players from California
Sportspeople from Corona, California
Association football midfielders
Philippines youth international footballers
Filipino footballers
Filipino people of American descent